Code page 858 (CCSID 858) (also known as CP 858, IBM 00858, OEM 858) is a code page used under DOS to write Western European languages.

Similarly to code page 850, code page 858 supports the entire repertoire of ISO 8859-1, but in a different arrangement. Code page 858 was created from code page 850 in 1998 by changing code point 213 (D5hex) from dotless i (ı) (a character not included in ISO-8859-1) to the euro sign (€). Unlike most code pages modified to support the euro sign, the generic currency sign at CFhex (an ISO-8859-1 character, changed to the euro sign in ISO-8859-15) was not chosen as the character to replace.

Still, instead of adding support for the new code page 858, IBM's PC DOS 2000, also released in 1998, changed the definition of the existing code page 850 to what IBM called modified code page 850 to include the euro sign at code point 213. More recent IBM/MS products implemented codepage 858 under its own ID.

Character set
The following table shows code page 858. Each character appears with its equivalent Unicode code-point. The decimal value of the location is the Alt code. Only the second half of the table (code points 128–255) is shown, the first half (code points 0–127) being the same as code page 850.

Notes

References

858